Andrey Rublev was the defending champion, but chose to not defend his title as he and other Russian Olympic athletes were sent to Yuzhno-Sakhalinsk for training sessions.

Pablo Carreño Busta won his maiden ATP Tour 500 singles title, defeating Filip Krajinović in the final, 6–2, 6–4.

Seeds
The top four seeds received a bye into the second round.

Draw

Finals

Top half

Bottom half

Qualifying

Seeds

Qualifiers

Lucky losers

Qualifying draw

First qualifier

Second qualifier

Third qualifier

Fourth qualifier

Fifth qualifier

Sixth qualifier

References

External links
Main draw
Qualifying draw

Men's Singles